Tyler Bensinger is an American film and television writer, producer and film director.

Career 
Bensinger grew up in Los Angeles and attended the Webb School of California.  He earned his B.A. as an English Major at Yale before attending UCLA Film School where he received his MFA.  He began his career writing features and wrote and directed the film Just Looking. Bensinger moved from features to TV in the late nineties and has written on numerous shows including The Cape (1996), The Pretender, Beverly Hills 90210, Titans, Going to California, Dragnet, Cold Case, Justice, Viva Laughlin, Harper's Island, Parenthood, Prime Suspect, Masters of Sex,  Nashville,  The Good Wife,  Notorious and This Is Us.  He has been nominated for a Writers Guild of America Award (Masters of Sex) and an Emmy Award (This Is Us).

Bensinger is also an award winning photographer.  His monograph There and Away won first place in the International Photography Awards/Lucie Foundation competition in 2018. Bensinger's photographs have been featured twice in Lens' Magazine (issues 69 and 83).

References

External links 

American film directors
Living people
American television producers
American television writers
American male television writers
Yale College alumni
UCLA Film School alumni
Year of birth missing (living people)